Nathan Dales is a Canadian actor from Calgary, Alberta. He is most noted for his starring role as Daryl in Letterkenny, for which he was a Canadian Screen Award nominee for Best Supporting Actor in a Comedy Series at the 5th Canadian Screen Awards in 2017.

A graduate of the American Academy of Dramatic Arts, he has also had roles in the television series Tower Prep and The Indian Detective, and the films Goon: Last of the Enforcers, Resident Evil: Welcome to Raccoon City and The Broken Hearts Gallery.

Filmography

Film

Television

References

External links

21st-century Canadian male actors
Canadian male film actors
Canadian male television actors
Male actors from Calgary
American Academy of Dramatic Arts alumni
Living people
Year of birth missing (living people)